Condorito (Little Condor in Spanish) is a Chilean comic book and comic strip series that features an anthropomorphic condor living in a fictitious town named Pelotillehue, a typical small Chilean provincial town. He is meant to be a representation of the Chilean people.

Condorito was first published on August 6, 1949, created by the Chilean cartoonist René Ríos, known as Pepo. Condorito is very popular throughout Latin America, where the character is considered part of the general popular culture. Condorito and his friends appear in a daily comic strip.

By 2012, was read in 105 Spanish-language newspapers distributed in 19 countries, including Canada, United States, Italy, and Japan. 1,369 million of its comic strips are published annually, being together with Mafalda the most relevant Hispanic comic book character in the world.

Characteristics 
One peculiar characteristic of Condorito is that the character, after going through an embarrassing moment or being the butt of the joke in a given strip, almost always falls backwards to the floor (legs visible or out of frame) in the final panel, although new comic strips have now put the victim of the joke looking at the reader instead. This classic comic strip "flop take" is accompanied by a free-fall onomatopoeic sound (usually ¡Plop!). From time to time, this is replaced by the victim of the joke saying ¡Exijo una explicación! ("I demand an explanation!"), usually as a twist or downbeat ending. Another catchphrase, usual for Condorito, but used with almost all the characters, is "Reflauta", to show frustration or other emotions.

The comic styles that predominate in Condorito are white humor and satire. The edition is very careful so that profanity or obscenities do not appear. White humor is generated from situations that are resolved in a ridiculous or extraordinary way.

In order for readers in other Spanish-speaking countries to understand the jokes, many of them had to be modified: excessively marked Chileanisms were removed and certain references to Chile were stopped.

Over the years, Condorito character has grown, being now older than in his beginnings, and even with a bigger belly.

According to Alberto Montt, manager of the World Editors company:

Comic traits 
In Condorito, stereotypes for characters and situations are regularly used, although in general the humor is white, they reflect the mentality and habitual humor of past decades: jokes about the crazy or insane, stupid, drunk, infidelity, machismo, ethnic, medical and sick, usurers, peasants recently arrived in the city, etc.

Generally, when kiosks are drawn, apart from the newspaper El Hocicón, they display various magazines that parody well-known international magazines in their names. Thus we have: Vanidosa by Vanidades, Cosmopolita by Cosmopolitan, Bad Housekeeping by Good Housekeeping, Unpopular Mechanics by Popular Mechanics, FeoMundo by GeoMundo, Ideas para robar by Ideas para su hogar, Yo by Tú, Spicnik by Sputnik, Sinlecciones by Selecciones, Conozca Menos by Conozca Más, Vago por Vogue, Nada Interesante by Muy Interesante, El Humorista by El Economista, Casos by Cosas, among other. Likewise, they usually also sell magazines supposedly for adults since a half-naked woman almost always appears on their covers.

On the other hand, and depending on the situation, Condorito himself appears represented as belonging to different races or cultures: although he is white, he frequently appears as black or oriental. In addition, colloquial language is used to reinforce the verbal abuse of which the characters are victims ("gross huaso", "roto marginal", "peeled", etc.).

Cartoonists and collaborators 
As the frequency of publication of the Condorito magazine increased, Pepo had to form a team of cartoonists and collaborators. Among the first were Renato Andrade Alarcón "Nato" (1921-2006), Jorge Carvallo Muñoz "Jorcar" (1932-2017), Ricardo González Paredes "Ric" (1936-2011) and Eduardo de la Barra (cartoonist) (1942-2013), Hernán Vidal "Hervi" (b. 1943) and Guillermo Durán Castro "Guidu" (b. 1946). Later, Alberto Vivanco Ortiz (b. 1939) also collaborated and Víctor Hugo Aguirre Abarca "Tom" (b. 1944). Other people who joined the Condorito team between the 50s and 60s were Jorge Délano Concha (b. 1958), Daniel Fernández, Marta García, Luis Peñaloza, Nelson Pérez (lyricist), Sergio Nawrath, Samuel "Sam" Gana Godoy (1932-2016), Dino Gnecco Zavallia (1935-2014), Edmundo Pezoa Cartagena (b. 1943), Christian Pardow Smith (1945-2002) and Luis Osses Asenjo (1947-2018).

In the decades from the 70s to the 90s, in addition to previous members such as Gana, Osses, Pardow and Gnecco, the team was integrated at different stages and as a stable member or collaborator, among others, by Osvaldo Fernández, Manuel Ferrada, José Luis Gaete Calderón (b. 1953), Rubén Eyzaguirre Santis (b. 1960) Víctor Figueroa Barra, Mario Igor Vargas (1929-1995), Avelino García Llorente (n. 1932), Nelson Soto (n. 1937), Luis Caracuel Saavedra (b. 1959), Sergio González Barrios (b. 1959), Elizabeth Villalón, Lorenzo Mejías "Loren", Emiliano Zúñiga (lyricist), Vicente "Vicho" Plaza Santibáñez (b. 1961) and Jorge Montealegre Iturra (screenwriter, b. 1954). From the 1990s and in the first decades of the 21st century, it is worth mentioning Juan Cano Alcayaga (lyricist, b. 1943), Juan Enrique Plaza Vera (1958-2022), Luis Sepúlveda Suazo (b. 1959), Ivy Pardow Olivares, Álvaro Flores Sepúlveda, Mario Meneses Labrin, and Rodrigo Boettcher Retamal.

Characters

 Condorito: The main character, Condorito is an anthropomorphic condor, lackadaisical and unambitious, but also kind, loyal, friendly and ingenious. 
 Yayita: Condorito's "fashionable eternal fiancée." She loves him but hates his reluctance to discuss marriage.
 Don Chuma: Condorito's best, most loyal friend, he is a tall, thin, kind man who helps Condorito to solve some of his problems.
 Pepe Cortisona: Condorito's nemesis, especially when it comes to courting Yayita.
 Coné: Condorito's young nephew. Coné had a series of his own, aimed at younger audiences, and its supporting cast included many of his uncle's friends' children. 
 Yuyito: Yayita's tomboyish niece and Coné's best friend and partner in crime.

Publishing trajectory

Origins

In 1942, the Walt Disney Company created the animated film Saludos Amigos depicting Donald Duck and a cast of anthropomorphic characters representing various nations of the Americas: Argentina, Brazil, Colombia, Mexico and Peru. In the film, while the Disney characters are represented as humorous versions of charros, gauchos, etc., Chile was represented as Pedro, a small airplane engaged in his very first flight, whose attempt to fly over the Andes to pick up air mail from Mendoza is humorously depicted. Pepo created Condorito in response to what he perceived as a slight to the image of Chile.

The first publication of a Condorito comic strip was in the first issue of Okey magazine, owned by Zig-Zag, on August 6, 1949. In it, Condorito appeared as a thief of occasional chickens, who later regrets eating them. and tries to return it to the chicken coop but is stopped by a police officer and imprisoned. In the Condorito prison, he imagined the policeman eating the tasty chicken. The comic strip was two full pages long.

Condorito's following publications were based on a character who came from the countryside driven by the rural-urban migration that lived in Chile during the 1950s; Condorito's personality was that of a joker, witty and mischievous. According to screenwriter Jorge Montealegre, «Condorito's profile in the first cartoons is focused on the Chilean roto [...] where very Chilean institutions are addressed, such as the compadrazgo with Don Chuma and the huacherío through Coné».

During the Okey magazine editions, Condorito was given a real context in a fictitious town, Pelotillehue, along with family members and situations closer to people.

By 1955, the year of the appearance of the first collection of Condorito jokes, the character already had its definitive appearance. As a publication, Condorito appeared on December 21 of that year. The comic strip  Condorito has a characteristic format by which it has been published from its origins in a specific range of colors that only include red, brown, pink, black, white, gray and, from time to time, the green.

One of the only surviving cartoonists who worked with Pepo at the beginning of Condorito is the cartoonist Hernán Vidal (Hervi) who, at just 13 years old, became Pepo's assistant.

Popularization 
In 1961, Condorito began to be published twice a year. From number 7 to number 82 they were called «Condoritos numerados» (Numbered Condoritos) because they had their prominent numbering on the cover. Condorito's book number 9, which came out in 1962, was dedicated to the Soccer World Cup held that same year in Chile. From 1965 to 1982, it was published irregularly; however, it began to be published regularly on a quarterly basis starting in 1970, and did so until the last issue of 1979.

Internationalization 
In 1974 the first products related to Condorito came out in coloring books. In February 1975, the first Condorito compilation came out, called Especial Condorito: Clásicos de la historieta (Condorito Special: Comic Classics). For Christmas 1975, the first Condorito toys came out: some Condorito and Coné dolls. In 1976 the international rights to Condorito were acquired by Editors Press Service, a subsidiary of the Evening Post Publishing Company. In Argentina in 1977, the first international edition of Condorito came out. Also in 1977, Editorial América and Bloque Dearmas began publishing the magazine in Colombia and Venezuela. In 1979 the last Condorito comics where he smokes appeared.

The 1980s were the best time for Condorito: Starting with the first edition of the 1980s, Condorito became a bimonthly publication.3 In February 1979, the first of a series of extraordinary editions went on sale of excellent quality and in giant size with hard covers and dimensions of 32 × 21.5 cm, except for one, (Condorito Campeón) of dimensions 26 × 18 cm. The collection was titled Selección de Oro de la revista Condorito (Gold Selection of Condorito magazine), and consisted of the following eleven numbers, each of them 64 pages:

In 1982, Condorito came out nine times a year. That same year, the first non-Hispanic edition of Condorito appeared, published in Brazil. In October 1982, Coné el Travieso (Coné the Naughty) came out for the first time, a pocket-sized magazine that appeared monthly with jokes about Condorito's naughty nephew that appeared in number 22 of 1967. Coné el Travieso, in addition to the usual Coné and Yuyito, new characters were added, such as Huevito, Genito, Fonolita, Tacañito and Gargantita. In 1983 Condorito was published regularly in a monthly magazine format, and it did so until 1989. In 1986 the first special editions came out. In 1987 the first Libro de Oro (Golden Book) in Mexico was published, which, from 2004, became the Libro Gigante de Oro (Golden Giant Book) and since 2006 includes puzzles to solve called Condoripuzzles. In 1988, Juegos Condorito (Condorito Games) appeared, a quarterly publication. Between 1989 and 2019, Condorito magazine was published every fortnight.

Condorito and politics
Condorito through the 1960s and 1970s held to a conservative perspective on Chile and its society, poking fun at both the new left-wing poets and the hippies. At the first age of the comic, the jokes usually have a very basic context and themes, like African people always represented as primitive cannibals, women as bad drivers or as a jealous wife waiting for her husband to come back from a party, etc.

After the military coup of 1973, some Chilean cartoonists were censored by the military regime, yet unlike other publications (such as the Argentinian Mafalda), which combined criticism of society with humor, Condorito, which lacked the former, continued to be published. Since that time, many Chilean comics with a political view on society (e.g. Hervi's Super Cifuentes) have been forgotten. Condorito remains the best-known Chilean comic book character.

Film

In commemoration of its 66th anniversary of the launch of the comic strip, an animated film adaptation was released on October 12, 2017, in Latin America. by 20th Century Fox and in the United States on January 12, 2018, by Pantelion Films.

References

External links 
 Official web site in Spanish

1949 comics debuts
National personifications
Chilean comics
Comics characters introduced in 1949
Gag-a-day comics
Fictional birds of prey
Fictional Chilean people
South American comics